The Bronx Americans (also known as Bronx St. Martin's) was an American basketball team based in the Bronx, New York that was a member of the American Basketball League.

Year-by-year

Basketball teams in New York City
Sports in the Bronx